Aeromicrobium ponti is a Gram-positive, aerobic and non-motile bacterium from the genus Aeromicrobium which has been isolated from sea water from the Hwasun Beach in Korea.

References 

Propionibacteriales
Bacteria described in 2008